Kingston was launched in 1806 at Liverpool. She made one voyage as a slave ship. Thereafter she traded with the West Indies until she was lost in 1809.

Career
Kingston appeared in Lloyd's Register in 1806 with Callaghan, master, Litt & Co., owner, built in Liverpool, and trade Liverpool—Africa.

On 18 August 1806 Captain Patrick Callan acquired a letter of marque. He then sailed from Liverpool on 23 September 1806 on a slave trading voyage to the Bight of Biafra and Gulf of Guinea islands. He acquired his slaves at Bonny and on 28 April 1807 delivered 315 to Jamaica. Kingston sailed from Jamaica on 25 July and arrived back at Liverpool on 4 October. She had left with 57 crew members and suffered eight crew deaths on the voyage.

New owners then sailed Kingston as a West Indiaman.

Fate
Lloyd's List reported on 2 March 1810 that Kingston, Bruxton, master, had been lost at Barbuda while sailing from St Croix to Liverpool. The Register of Shipping for 1810 has the notation "LOST" by her name.

Notes, citations, and references
Notes

Citations

References
 

1806 ships
Liverpool slave ships
Age of Sail merchant ships
Merchant ships of the United Kingdom
Maritime incidents in 1810
Shipwrecks in the Caribbean Sea